The German Women's Volleyball Supercup  is a women's volleyball competition between the champion of Germany and the winner of the Cup of Germany . The first edition of this competition was contested in the 1988 season.

Winners list

Hounours by club

References

External links
www.volleyball-verband.de